Oleksandr Oleksandrovych Murashko; also known as Aleksandr Murashko (August 26 or September 7, 1875 – June 14, 1919) was a prominent Ukrainian painter.

Life and career
Murashko was born in Kyiv. His stepfather, Oleksandr Ivanovych Murashko, had an icon-painting workshop and worked on the interior of St Volodymyr's Cathedral.

In 1894, with recommendations from several prominent artists, he entered the Imperial Academy of Arts in St Petersburg. In 1896 he became a student of Ilya Repin; he is one of those depicted in Yelena Makovskaya-Luksch's group portrait, Repin's Students. In 1901 he travelled abroad, visiting Germany, where he studied with Anton Ažbe in Munich, Italy, and France, where he was greatly influenced.

Murashko became a successful artist; he has been called "the most important Ukrainian artist of the turn of the century". His painting Carousel won the gold medal at the Munich Exposition in 1909, and he exhibited in Venice, Rome, Amsterdam, Berlin, Cologne, and Düsseldorf.

From 1909 to 1912 Murashko taught at the Kyiv Art School. In 1913 he opened his own studio in the Ginsburg skyscraper, where many young Jewish artists were trained, including Mark Epstein. He had a great influence on Kazimir Malevich.

He was a patriotic Ukrainian, one of the adherents of the "Young Muse" movement which was started in 1906 by Modernists who drew on developments elsewhere in Europe to make Ukrainian art more progressive. He founded the Association of Kyiv Artists in 1916 and the following year co-founded the Ukrainian State Academy of Arts.

In 1909 Murashko married Marguerite Kruger, a notary's daughter. In 1910, after his father's death, he bought a small house in the Kyiv suburb of Lukyanivka. He was taken away from the house, apparently by a street gang, and shot from behind on June 14, 1919. His funeral was well attended and he was buried in Lukyanivsky Cemetery.

Works
Originally a realist in the style of the Peredvizhniki, Murashko later painted in a "refined", Impressionist style influenced by his time in Munich and Paris. His Modernism in turn influenced later Ukrainian artists in the Socialist Realist period. His works are less often narrative and unusually expressive for Ukrainian paintings of the time.

Selected list of paintings

 Portrait of Nikolai Petrov, 1897–98
 Portrait of Helen Murashko, 1898–99
 Portrait of Olga Nesterov, 1900
 The Funeral of the Chieftain, 1900
 Parisian. At the Cafe, 1902–03
 Girl in a Red Hat, 1902–03
 A Girl with a Dog. Portrait of T. Yazevoyi, 1903–04
 Portrait of Professor Adrian Prahova, 1904
 Winter, 1905
 At the Embroidery Frame. Portrait of Helena Prahova, 1905
 Carousel, 1906
 In the Stern. Portrait of George Murashko, 1906
 Sunspots. Portrait of George Murashko, 1908
 Portrait of Marguerite Murashko, 1909
 The Annunciation, 1909
 Portrait of Ludmilla Kuksin, 1910
 Portrait of Vera Dytyatinoyi, 1910
 Portrait of Vera Yepanchin, 1910
 By the Pond. Portrait of Marguerite Murashko, 1913
 Peasant Family, 1914
 Washerwoman, 1914
 Portrait of an Old Woman, 1916
 Woman with Flowers, 1918
 Self Portrait, 1918

References

Further reading
 «Эти десять лет большого, глубокого счастья...» : Спогади Маргарити Мурашко / Авт. ст. та ком. Дар’я Добріян; укл. Віталій Ткачук. — К. : ArtHuss, 2016. — 168 с. : іл.
 Dmytro Antonovych. Oleksander Murashko: 1875–1919. Maĭstri ukraïnsʹkoho mystet︠s︡tva. Prague: Vyd-vo Ukraïnsʹkoï molodi, 1925.  
 A. Shpakov. Oleksandr Oleksandrovych Murashko: narys pro zhytti︠a︡ i tvorchistʹ. Kiev: Derz︠h︡. vyd-vo obrazotvorchoho mystet︠s︡tva i muz. lit-ry URSR, 1959.  
 Олександр Мурашко. Твори з колекції національного художнього музею України. Catalogue. Kiev: National Art Museum of Ukraine, 2000. pdf download

External links
 

1875 births
1919 deaths
Artists from Kyiv
People from Kievsky Uyezd
20th-century Ukrainian painters
20th-century Ukrainian male artists
Ukrainian male painters
Academic staff of the National Academy of Visual Arts and Architecture